Phragmataecia turkmenbashi is a species of moth of the family Cossidae. It is found in Turkmenistan (the Kopetdagh Mountains, Valley of Ipay-Kala).

References

Moths described in 2008
Phragmataecia